Lampranthus zeyheri, the trailing iceplant (a name it shares with other members of its family), is a species of flowering plant in the family Aizoaceae, native to the eastern Cape Provinces of South Africa. It is occasionally planted as an ornamental.

References

zeyheri
Garden plants of Southern Africa
Endemic flora of South Africa
Flora of the Cape Provinces
Plants described in 1930
Taxa named by N. E. Brown
Taxa named by Joseph zu Salm-Reifferscheidt-Dyck